Sepak takraw at the 2005 Southeast Asian Games took place in the Gymnasium of the University of San Carlos in Cebu City, Philippines. The event was held from November 27 to December 4.

Medal table

Medalists

Men

Women

External links
Southeast Asian Games Official Results

2005 Southeast Asian Games events
2005